BPG may refer to:

 Baishideng Publishing Group, an American publishing company
 Better Portable Graphics, a file format for coding digital images
 Big Spring McMahon–Wrinkle Airport (FAA location identifier), near Big Spring, Texas
 Bisphosphoglycerate, a molecule with two biologically important isomers:
 1,3-Bisphosphoglyceric acid, a metabolite in glycolysis
 2,3-Bisphosphoglyceric acid, regulates hemoglobin
 Bourne Publishing Group, a British publishing company
 Broadcasting Press Guild, a British association of journalists